Mary Callery (June 19, 1903 – February 12, 1977) was an American artist known for her Modern and Abstract Expressionist sculpture. She was part of the New York School art movement of the 1940s, 1950s and 1960s.

It is said she "wove linear figures of acrobats and dancers, as slim as spaghetti and as flexible as India rubber, into openwork bronze and steel forms. A friend of Picasso, she was one of those who brought the good word of French modernism to America at the start of World War II".

Biography

Early life and education 

Mary Callery was born June 19, 1903, in New York City and raised in Pittsburgh, Pennsylvania. She was the daughter of Julia Welch and James Dawson Callery, the President of the Diamond National Bank and Chairman of Pittsburgh Railways Company.

Callery studied at the Art Students League of New York (1921–1925) with Edward McCartan and moved to Paris in 1930. From 1930 to 1940, Callery worked in France, where she met and became friends with Pablo Picasso, Henri Matisse, Fernand Léger, Alexander Calder, Aristide Maillol, and other leading artists of the day and collected their art. During this same period, she also developed her talents as a modern sculptor, studying privately under Jacques Loutchansky.

Career 
When Germany occupied Paris during World War II, she returned to the United States with "more Picassos than anyone in America" according to Alfred Barr of the Museum of Modern Art.

After returning to New York, Callery played an instrumental role in the development and growth of ULAE (Universal Limited Art Editions, Inc.). For many years, ULAE primarily published reproductions. It is thought by many that Mary Callery was the first artist to print original work at ULAE. Callery’s first edition with ULAE, Sons of Morning, was completed in 1955. The paper that Callery’s second edition, Variations on a Theme of “Callery-Léger”, was printed on was called the “Callery gray” was used by Mrs. Grosman for the studio’s first printed labels, and is still the trademark gray ULAE uses today.

Architect Philip Johnson, whom she had met her in Paris, became a close friend, and he introduced her to major players in the world of business and art in New York, including Nelson and Abby Rockefeller. Wallace Harrison, who along with Johnson, was responsible for the design of Lincoln Center, commissioned Callery to create a sculpture for the top of the proscenium arch at the Metropolitan Opera House. Described as "an untitled ensemble of bronze forms creating a bouquet of sculptured arabesques," it is perhaps her best known work. It is most affectionately known by The Metropolitan Opera Company members as "The Car Wreck" and more infrequently as "Spaghetti Spoon in Congress with Plumbers Strap."

She was represented by the prestigious art dealers M. Knoedler & Co. and the Curt Valentin Gallery, and she exhibited in more than twenty noteworthy solo and group exhibitions. She became an acquaintance of Georgia O'Keeffe and in 1945 made a sculpture of O'Keeffe's head.

In 1945, she was invited to join the summer faculty of Black Mountain College in North Carolina, where she taught alongside Josef Albers, Robert Motherwell, Lyonel Feininger, and Walter Gropius.

Personal life 
In 1923, she married Frederic R. Coudert Jr., lawyer (and future member of Congress). They had one daughter, Caroline, born in 1926. Mary sought a divorce from Coudert in 1930 and in 1931 married Italian textile industrialist and fine art collector Carlo Frua de Angeli. This second marriage also ended in divorce. Following the beginning of the Second World War, she carried on a romantic relationship with architect Mies van der Rohe who designed an artist's studio for her in Huntington, on Long Island, New York.

Later life and death 
In her later years, Callery maintained studios in New York, Huntington, Long Island, and Paris. She died on February 12, 1977, at the American Hospital of Paris. She is buried in Cadaqués, Spain.

Solo exhibitions
1944, 1947, 1950, 1952, 1955: Buchholz Gallery, New York City
1946: Arts Club of Chicago
1947, 1949, 1950–1952, 1955: Curt Valentin Gallery, New York City
1949: Salon du Mai, Paris
1951: Margaret Brown Gallery, Boston, Massachusetts
1954: Galerie des Cahiers d'Art
1957, 1961, 1965: M. Knoedler & Co., New York City
1962: M. Knoedler & Co., Paris
1968: C. Holland Gallery, New York

Group exhibitions
1939: Salon des Tuileries, Paris; The Museum of Modern Art, New York City; The Whitney Museum of American Art, NYC; The Art Institute of Chicago; Museum of Fine Arts, Houston, Texas
1946: The City Art Museum of St. Louis, Missouri
1947-52: Painting toward architecture (Miller Company Collection of Abstract Art) at the Wadsworth Atheneum and 24 other venues 
1949: 3rd Sculpture International at the Philadelphia Museum of Art, Philadelphia, Pennsylvania
1956: Munson-Williams-Proctor Institute, Utica, New York
1958: Dallas Museum of Art, Dallas, Texas; Brussels World's Fair
2000: The Enduring Figure 1890s-1970s: Sixteen Sculptors from the National Association of Women Artists at Zimmerli Art Museum, Rutgers, The State University of New Jersey, New Brunswick, NJ (December 12, 1999 – March 12, 2000).

Collections
Addison Gallery of American Art, Phillips Academy, Andover, Massachusetts
The Aldrich Contemporary Art Museum, Ridgefield, Connecticut
CIT Corporation
The Cincinnati Art Museum, Cincinnati, Ohio
The Detroit Institute of Arts, Detroit, Michigan
Eastland Shopping Center, Detroit
Hirshhorn Museum and Sculpture Garden, Washington, DC
Indianapolis Museum of Art
Laughlin Children's Center, Sewickley, Pennsylvania
The Wadsworth Atheneum, Hartford, Connecticut
The Museum of Modern Art, New York City
 National Gallery of Art, Washington, DC
New York University, New York City
San Francisco Museum of Modern Art, San Francisco, California
Toledo Museum of Art, Toledo, Ohio
The Whitney Museum of American Art, New York City
The Metropolitan Opera House, New York City
The Governor Nelson A. Rockefeller Empire State Plaza Art Collection, Albany, NY

References

Bibliography
John I. H. Baur, Revolution and Tradition in modern American Art, Cambridge, Harvard University Press, 1951
Ulrich Gertz, Contemporary plastic art, Berlin, Rembrandt-Verlag, 1955
Carola Giedion-Welcker, Contemporary sculpture, an evolution in volume and space, New York, G. Wittenborn, 1961, ©1960
Fred Licht, Sculpture, 19th & 20th centuries, Greenwich, Connecticut, New York Graphic Society, 1967
E.H. Ramsden, Sculpture: theme and variations, towards a contemporary aesthetic, London, Lund, Humphries, 1953
Herbert Read,  A concise history of modern sculpture, New York, Praeger, 1964 , 
Andrew Carnduff Ritchie, Sculpture of the twentieth century (exhibition catalogue), New York: Museum of Modern Art, ©1952
Michel Seuphor, The sculpture of the century: dictionary of modern sculpture, Zwemmer, 1960
Eduard Trier, Form and space; sculpture of the twentieth century, New York, Praeger, 1962
Philip R. Adams, Mary Callery Sculpture. Distributed by Wittenborn and Company, New York, 1961
Marika Herskovic, American Abstract Expressionism of the 1950s An Illustrated Survey (New York School Press, 2003.)

External links
Mary Callery biography from askart.com (with image of Acrobats with Birds)
'Life Images: Mary Callery'
'Metropolitan Museum of Art database'
Article on Callery's Metropolitan Opera sculpture

1903 births
1977 deaths
Abstract expressionist artists
American women sculptors
Modern sculptors
Artists from New York City
Black Mountain College faculty
20th-century American sculptors
20th-century American women artists
Sculptors from New York (state)
American women academics